Robert Mauck Switzer (March 6, 1863 – October 28, 1952) was an American educator, lawyer and politician who served four terms as a U.S. Representative from Ohio from 1911 to 1919.

Biography

Early life
Born near Gallipolis, Ohio, Robert Switzer attended the district schools, Gallia Academy, and Rio Grande College. He attended the law departments of the University of Virginia at Charlottesville and the Ohio State University of Columbus.

Career
He taught school from 1883-1887. He then served as Deputy Sheriff of Gallia County 1888-1892.

He was admitted to the bar in 1892 and commenced practice in Gallipolis, Ohio. He served as prosecuting attorney of Gallia County 1893-1900. He served as delegate to the Republican National Conventions in 1900 and 1920.

He was elected as a Republican to the Sixty-second and to the three succeeding Congresses (March 4, 1911 – March 3, 1919). He served on the Subcommittee of the Committee on Mines and Mining which investigated the Copper Country Strike of 1913–14. He was an unsuccessful candidate for renomination in 1918 to the Sixty-sixth Congress. He also served as City solicitor of Gallipolis, Ohio. He then resumed the practice of law.

Death
He died in Gallipolis, Ohio, on October 28, 1952, and he was interred in Mound Hill Cemetery.

Sources

1863 births
1952 deaths
People from Gallipolis, Ohio
Ohio lawyers
Ohio State University Moritz College of Law alumni
University of Virginia School of Law alumni
University of Rio Grande alumni
County district attorneys in Ohio
Republican Party members of the United States House of Representatives from Ohio